Elford is an English surname and occasionally a given name. Notable people with the name include:

Given name
 Elford Albin Cederberg (1918–2006), American politician from Michigan

Surname
 John Elford ( 1966–1976), Australian rugby league footballer
 John Paul Elford (1922–1991), American Roman Catholic priest
 Keith A. Elford, bishop emeritus of the Free Methodist Church in Canada
 Richard Elford (c. 1677–1714), English singer
 Shane Elford (born 1977) Australian rugby league player
 Vic Elford (born 1935) English sportscar racing, rallying and Formula One driver
 Sir William Elford, 1st Baronet (1749–1837), English banker, politician, and amateur artist

As part of a compound surname
 William Elford Leach (1791–1836), English zoologist and marine biologist
 Lateef Elford-Alliyu (born 1992) is an English football striker

Places
 Elford, village in Staffordshire, England
 North Ravenswood, West Virginia, United States; a neighborhood of the city of Ravenswood in Jackson County, West Virginia; it used to be called Elford.

English-language surnames